Thomas Henry Freer (1833–1904) was Archdeacon of Derby from 1891 to 1904.

Born in Birmingham, he was educated at King Edward's School, Birmingham and Trinity College, Cambridge. He was ordained deacon in 1861 and priest in 1863.
He was a teacher at Wellington College from 1861 to 1875; Rector of Sudbury from 1877 and Canon of Southwell from 1890.

He died on 26 June 1904.

Notes

1833 births
People from Birmingham, West Midlands
People educated at Wellington College, Berkshire
Alumni of Trinity College, Cambridge
Archdeacons of Derby
1904 deaths
People from Sudbury, Derbyshire